Sematext, a globally distributed organization, builds cloud and on-premises systems for application-performance monitoring, alerting and anomaly detection, centralized logging, log management and analytics, and real user monitoring. The company also provides search and Big Data consulting services and offers 24/7 production support and training for Solr and Elasticsearch to clients worldwide. The company markets its core products to engineers and DevOps and its services to organizations using Elasticsearch, Solr, Lucene, Hadoop, HBase, Docker, Spark, Kafka, and many other platforms. Otis Gospodnetić (the co-author of Lucene in Action, the founder of Simpy, and committer on Lucene, Solr, Nutch, Apache Mahout, and Open Relevance projects) founded Sematext.  Privately held, Sematext has its headquarters in Brooklyn, NY.

Sematext Cloud (SaaS) and Sematext Enterprise (on-premises) provide infrastructure monitoring, application performance monitoring, transaction tracing, real user & synthetic monitoring and log management.

External links
 Corporate website

References

American companies established in 2007
Technology companies established in 2007